Dodia maja is a moth of the family Erebidae. It was described by Jurij Rekelj and M. Česanek in 2009. It is found in the Russian Far East (Magadan territory). Adults are found from mid-June to early July.

References

Callimorphina
Moths described in 2009